Wesley Tyler Glass (born October 26, 1992), known professionally as Wheezy, is an American record producer and songwriter. He has worked with artists such as Lil Uzi Vert, Young Thug, Lil Baby, Future, King Von, 21 Savage, Gunna, Nav, Travis Scott, Playboi Carti, Bankroll Mafia, Trippie Redd, Juice Wrld, Rich the Kid, Meek Mill, among others.

Wheezy has produced many notable songs throughout his career, such as the 2018 songs "Yes Indeed" by Lil Baby and Drake, and "Going Bad" by Meek Mill featuring Drake.

Wheezy solely produced all songs from American rapper Gunna's debut extended play, Drip or Drown (2017). He later served as executive producer alongside American record producer Turbo and American rapper Young Thug for Gunna's debut studio album, Drip or Drown 2 (2019) and his second studio album, Wunna (2020), also producing the majority of the songs from both albums.

As a songwriter he worked on the songs "iMi" and "We" by Bon Iver from their fourth studio album i, i (2019). Wheezy primarily produced Canadian rapper Nav's commercial mixtape, Emergency Tsunami (2020).

Early life and career
Wesley Tyler Glass was born on October 26, 1992, in Vicksburg, Mississippi. His mother is from Mississippi and his father from Atlanta, Georgia, where he would travel back and forth between, eventually residing in Atlanta.

Wheezy started making beats at the age of 15 for his brother, who went by TG Montana and taught him how to work within FL Studio. He then started working with Shad da God, who previously went by Rich Kid Shawty, an original member of Rich Kidz. Wheezy has been given production advice from experienced producers such as Metro Boomin, Southside, Sonny Digital and Lex Luger whom he has gotten the chance to collaborate with.

Production style and influences
The Fader wrote that Wheezy's production "tends toward the spacious and spare", and gave him credit for "much of the opaque, pristine production of 2015's Barter 6, and several highlights from the Slime Season series". He uses FL Studio, along with the M-Audio Oxygen 88 keyboard. Glass often utilizes samples, especially vintage sounds. He says he "blends" his snares. He frequently uses the VST Purity, which he has used since his early days as a producer. Glass' influences include Drumma Boy, Shawty Redd, DJ Toomp, and WondaGurl. His productions can be recognized by producer tag "Wheezy outta here".

Production discography

References

Living people
African-American record producers
American hip hop record producers
Southern hip hop musicians
Musicians from Atlanta
1992 births
21st-century African-American people